Alhaji Mohamed B. Daramy (born 1955 in Panguma, Lower Bambara Chiefdom, Kenema District, British Sierra Leone) is a Sierra Leonean politician. Daramy has many years of experience in industry, the private sector and in government having served as Minister of Labour, Minister of Trade, Minister of Transportation, Minister of Finance and recently Minister of Development and Economic Planning.

Early life and education
Daramy was born to late Alhaji Kemoh Daramy and Hadja Nmama Turay Daramy at Panguma, Lower Bambara Chiefdom,  Kenema District within the Eastern Province of British Sierra Leone. Both of his parents came from the Mandingo ethnic group.

He completed his primary education at the  Kailahun Primary School in Kailahun and later attended the Bo Government Secondary School in Bo where he successfully attained both his O and A level certificates.

Daramy moved to the United States where he obtained a Bachelor's degree in Business Administration, a master's degree in Business Administration with a Finance major. He is also a Certified Public Accountant (CPA) and a Certified Internal Auditor (CIA).

He is a former excellent soccer star who earned All-American status while at his at Elizabethtown College in Pennsylvania. He was drafted to play professional football but he turn down the offer to concentrate on school.

References 

1955 births
Sierra Leonean businesspeople
Living people
Government ministers of Sierra Leone
Elizabethtown College alumni
Sierra Leonean Mandingo people
People from Kenema District